3(3,4-dihydroxy-phenyl) propionic acid commonly referred to as dihydrocaffeic acid or DHCA is a phytochemical found in grapes and other plants. DHCA is known to lower IL-6 production through down regulation of DNMT1 expression and inhibition of DNA methylation of the IL-6 gene in mice. DHCA in combination with malvidin-3′-O-glucoside (Mal-gluc), is effective in promoting resilience against stress by modulating brain synaptic plasticity and peripheral inflammation. DHCA/Mal-gluc also significantly lowered depression like phenotypes in mice that had increased peripheral inflammation caused by transplantation of hematopoietic progenitor cells from other more stress-susceptible mice.

References

Phytochemicals
Phenolic acids